Vanessa Chefer Spínola (born 5 March 1990 in São Paulo) is a Brazilian heptathlete.

She finished 21st at the 2007 World Youth Championships and 16th at the 2008 World Junior Championships. She then won the 2009 South American Championships and finished fourth at the 2010 Ibero-American Championships. At the 2010 South American Games she did not finish the competition.

Personal bests
Her personal best score is 6188 points, achieved in July 2016 in São Bernardo do Campo.

Competition record

References

External links

1990 births
Living people
Brazilian heptathletes
Athletes (track and field) at the 2015 Pan American Games
Athletes (track and field) at the 2019 Pan American Games
World Athletics Championships athletes for Brazil
Pan American Games bronze medalists for Brazil
Athletes (track and field) at the 2016 Summer Olympics
Olympic athletes of Brazil
Pan American Games medalists in athletics (track and field)
Pan American Games athletes for Brazil
Competitors at the 2017 Summer Universiade
Medalists at the 2015 Pan American Games
Athletes from São Paulo